Amy Alsop is a Canadian Paralympian from Saskatoon. She is a two-time Paralympic gold medalist for goalball.

Early life
Alsop was born with only 10 per cent of her vision and used Canadian National Institute for the Blind services to gain independence. While learning to swim, Alsop met the coach of the local goalball team who encouraged her to join the sport.

Career
Alsop joined the Canadian National goalball team in 1997. She competed in the 2000 Summer Paralympics where she won a gold medal in Goalball.

Alsop was again selected to compete with Team Canada at the 2004 Summer Paralympics, where she won another gold medal by only allowing in 1.5 goals on 419 shots. As a result, she was nominated by Saskatchewan Blind Sports for the 2004 Athlete of the Month Award.

After retiring, she was hired at SaskTel in Regina as a service development manager. In 2013, she was appointed  community co-chair of the Citizen Consultation Team by the Government of Saskatchewan.

References

External links
 

Year of birth missing (living people)
Living people
Female goalball players
Goalball players at the 2000 Summer Paralympics
Goalball players at the 2004 Summer Paralympics
Paralympic gold medalists for Canada
Medalists at the 2000 Summer Paralympics
Medalists at the 2004 Summer Paralympics
Sportspeople from Saskatoon
University of Saskatchewan alumni
Paralympic goalball players of Canada
Paralympic medalists in goalball
Medalists at the 2011 Parapan American Games